The Harrowing of Hell is a comic book written by Evan Dahm and published by Iron Circus Comics.

Background 
The comic book was originally intended to be published in March 2020, but the COVID-19 Pandemic pushed back the publication date to July 2020. The story is a retelling of Jesus's descent into hell, otherwise known as the Harrowing of Hell, which was originally depicted in the Gospel of Nicodemus. The story contains flashbacks to Jesus's life as he descends into hell. Throughout the comic book Jesus answers questions with vague responses and an emphasis on storytelling, which leaves his own story open to interpretation. Dahm used brush drawing to illustrate the book and the colors are limited to black, white, and red.

See also 
 Judas (comic book)

References

External links 

2020 comics debuts
2020 comics endings
American comics
Religious comics
Christian comics